Egelsee may refer to:

lakes
in Austria
Egelsee (Kärnten) at Spittal an der Drau, Carinthia
Egelsee (Tyrol) at Kufstein, Tyrol
Egelsee (Unterach) at Unterach, Upper Austria
in Switzerland
Egelsee (Aargau) at Bergdietikon, Canton of Aargau
Egelsee (Berne) in the City of Berne
Egelsee (Bubikon) at Bubikon, Canton of Zurich
Ägelsee (Zeiningen), also called Egelsee, at Zeiningen, Canton of Aargau